Nenapirali  is a 2005 Indian Kannada language film directed by Ratnaja. It stars Prem Kumar, Vidhya Venkatesh and Varsha. The supporting cast features Naveen Krishna, Ananth Nag, Jai Jagadish, Vijayalakshmi Singh and Vinaya Prasad.

At the 2005–06 Karnataka State Film Awards, the film won four awards: Second Best Film, Best Cinematographer (H. M. Ramachandra), Best Music Director (Hamsalekha) and Best Female Dubbing Artist (Amrutha Singh). The film also won five awards at the 53rd Filmfare Awards South, including the award for Best Film.

Plot
The film begins by introducing Ekanth (Naveen Krishna), the only son of a rich industrialist Sundar Raj (Anant Nag). He lives in Bangalore and manages his father's business which keeps him extremely busy. Ekanth is in love with an introverted girl, Indushree (Vidhya Venkatesh), from Mysore, who feels that Ekanth is not interested in her and is not serious about marrying her. In order to test his intentions, Indu decides to lie to Ekanth that her parents are looking for suitable grooms to arrange her marriage. She mentions that her parents would prefer that she marry someone from a political background. Now Ekanth gets slightly worried by the turn of events and hatches a scheme to convince Indu's parents for their marriage. Enter Kishore (Prem Kumar), Ekanth's best friend, who Ekanth instructs to pretend being in love with Indu. Kishore is a middle class simple boy who is very good at heart and agrees to Ekanth's request only to help his friend's love succeed. Reluctantly, Indu too agrees to participate in the false show of being in a relationship with Kishore. Since Indu's parents would disagree to Indu and Kishore's relationship (due to the societal differences), Ekanth thinks that his marriage proposal will be readily accepted in comparison to Kishore. Everything goes as per planned. However, Indu starts developing feelings towards Kishore while spending time with him. When she pours her heart out to Kishore, he immediately hastens conversations about Ekanth and Indu's marriage and eventually with everyone's consent, Indu and Ekanth get married. After Ekanth's marriage, Kishore, his mother and sister move to Mangalore to manage one of Ekanth's industry branches located there.

Bindu (Varsha) is Indu's sister who has just graduated and would like to gain some work experience. She requests her brother-in-law, Ekanth for a short stint at one of his industry locations and he recommends that she work alongside Kishore in Mangalore. Bindu moves to Mangalore and as days go by, Kishore and Bindu start enjoying each other's company and eventually fall in love with each other. Suddenly one day, Ekanth meets with a car accident and passes away. Deeply saddened by the turn of events and his widowed daughter-in-law, Sundar Raj (Eknath's father) wants Indu to remarry. Upon her family's persuasion and a meeting with Kishore after a long time, the flames of love for Kishore are reignited in Indu's heart and she insists that she will only remarry if it is going to be with Kishore. Bindu is tasked with gaining everyone's acceptance, including Kishore's. Heartbroken Bindu sets out on her mission and is ready to make the sacrifice for her sister's happiness. However, Kishore is very upset and tries as much as he can to dissuade Indu but to no avail. Indu expresses her love and interest in him once again, which Kishore refuses to accept. The climax of the movie is one that leaves audience happy, with Kishore and Bindu ultimately triumphing with their love. Indu isn't greatly pleased by this but accepts her destiny for her sister's happiness.

Cast
 Prem Kumar as Kishore
 Vidhya Venkatesh as Indushree
 Varsha as Bindushree
 Naveen Krishna as Ekanth
 Anant Nag as Ekanth's father
 Jai Jagadish as Indushree's father
 Vijayalakshmi Singh as Indushree's mother
 Vinaya Prasad
 Chitra Shenoy
 Sharan

Soundtrack

Hamsalekha composed the background score for the film and the soundtrack, also penning the lyrics for them. The soundtrack album consists of eight tracks.

Critical reception
Upon theatrical release, the film was reviewed positively by critics. B. S. Srivani of Deccan Herald said the film ".. is a classic example of how the crucial components of a film can bring out a clean, almost irreproachable product. Taut direction, crisp dialogues that do not pontificate, slick editing and the sheer poetic spell cast by the camera and music come together to make a delectable concoction." She gave special praise to the cinematographer H. M. Ramachandra for having captured "locales of Mysore, Mangalore and Bangalore ... beautifully." R. G. Vijayasarathy of Rediff reviewed the film and called it "a cut above the rest in terms of quality and presentation." He praised the roles of the technical departments of the film and concluded writing, "Nenapirali has class. It is a worthy addition to the list of good films from the Kannada film industry. A must for all industry enthusiasts." Viggy.com writes in praise of the director Rathnaja straightaway for having "displayed technical competency in his very first attempt." The role technical and acting departments were praised.

Awards

References 

2005 films
2000s Kannada-language films
Films scored by Hamsalekha